Skipton was a county constituency centred on the town of Skipton in Yorkshire which returned one Member of Parliament (MP) to the House of Commons of the Parliament of the United Kingdom.

It was created for the 1885 general election, and abolished nearly a hundred years later, for the 1983 general election.  It was then partly replaced by the new Skipton and Ripon constituency.

Boundaries
1885–1918: Part of the Wapentake of Skipton and Ewecross.

1918–1950: The Urban Districts of Barnoldswick, Earby, and Skipton, and the Rural Districts of Bowland, Sedbergh, Settle, and Skipton.

1950–1983: The Urban Districts of Barnoldswick, Earby, and Skipton, the Rural Districts of Bowland, Sedbergh, and Settle, and the Rural District of Skipton except the parishes of Steeton with Eastburn, and Sutton.

In 1974 the rural district of Sedbergh became part of the new county of Cumbria.

Members of Parliament

Elections

Elections in the 1880s

Elections in the 1890s

Elections in the 1900s

Elections in the 1910s 

General Election 1914–15:

Another General Election was required to take place before the end of 1915. The political parties had been making preparations for an election to take place and by the July 1914, the following candidates had been selected; 
Liberal: William Clough
Unionist: Richard Roundell

Elections in the 1920s

Elections in the 1930s 

General Election 1939–40

Another General Election was required to take place before the end of 1940. The political parties had been making preparations for an election to take place and by the Autumn of 1939, the following candidates had been selected; 
Conservative: George Rickards
Labour: John Davies

Elections in the 1940s

Elections in the 1950s

Elections in the 1960s

Elections in the 1970s

References 

 

Parliamentary constituencies in Yorkshire and the Humber (historic)
Constituencies of the Parliament of the United Kingdom established in 1885
Constituencies of the Parliament of the United Kingdom disestablished in 1983